Savery is an unincorporated community in southeastern Carbon County, Wyoming, United States, on the upper Little Snake River.  It lies along WYO 70 south of the city of Rawlins, the county seat of Carbon County.  Its elevation is 6,473 feet (1,973 m).  Although Savery is unincorporated, it has a post office with ZIP code 82332, and is home to the Little Snake River Museum.

Public education in the community of Savery is provided by Carbon County School District #1.

Noted mountain man Jim Baker, died here in 1898.  Two recent state representatives,  George R. Salisbury, Jr., and his son-in-law, Patrick F. O'Toole, both Democrats, came from Savery. O'Toole and his wife, Sharon Salisbury O'Toole, still operate the Ladder Ranch, founded by George Salisbury's ancestors.

References

External links

Unincorporated communities in Carbon County, Wyoming
Unincorporated communities in Wyoming